İsmayıllı may refer to:
Ismailli Rayon, Azerbaijan
İsmayıllı, capital of Ismailli Rayon, Azerbaijan
İsmayıllı, Kurdamir, Azerbaijan
Ismilli, Azerbaijan
İsmailli, Alaca